Oranienbaum may refer to:

 Germany
 Oranienbaum, Germany, a town in Saxony-Anhalt, Germany
 Oranienbaum-Wörlitz

 Russia
 Oranienbaum, Russia, a Russian royal residence
 Lomonosov, Russia (aka Oranienbaum-Lomonosov), the former name of the adjacent town
 Oranienbaum Bridgehead
 Battle of Narva (1944) or Oranienbaum Offensive